Call Girl of Cthulhu is a 2014 independently made horror film from Midnight Crew Studios that was directed by Chris LaMartina and stars David Phillip Carollo, Melissa O'Brien, and Nicolette le Faye. The film was distributed by Camp Motion Pictures and had its world premiere on May 8, 2014 at the Maryland Film Festival.

An artist falls in love with a woman who ends up being the chosen bride of Cthulhu. The film is very loosely based on the writings of H. P. Lovecraft.

Call Girl of Cthulhu makes reference to LaMartina's WNUF Halloween Special via the Shining Trapeze Strip Club, which is featured in a commercial shown during the film.

Virgin artist Carter (David Phillip Carollo) wants desperately to lose his virginity, but only to the right person. He thinks he has found the right person in Riley (Melissa O'Brien), a call girl with a strange birthmark on her right buttock.

Carter's dreams of romance are soon ruined, as several Cthulhu-worshiping cultists of the Church of Starry Wisdom see this birthmark as a sign that Riley is destined to become the bride of Cthulhu and bear his child.

It is up to Carter, aided by Edna Curwen (Helenmary Ball) and Squid (Sabrina Taylor-Smith), to find a way (with the aid of a spell from the Necronomicon) to stop the cult from fulfilling their plan to mate Riley to the Great Old One.

In-jokes
The film contains numerous in-jokes referencing the names of Lovecraft stories and characters, including Deep Ones condoms and Cool Air aerosol.

Cast

David Phillip Carollo as Carter Wilcox
Melissa O'Brien as Riley Whatley
Nicolette le Faye as Erica Zann
Dave Gamble as Sebastian Suydum
Helenmary Ball	as Professor Edna Curwen
Sabrina Taylor-Smith as Squid
Alex Mendez as Rick 'The Dick' Pickman
Craig Peter Coletta as Wilbur
Elena Rose as Whitney
George Stover as Walter Delapore
Leanna Chamish as Detective Rita LaGrassi
Troy Jennings as Ashton Eibon
Stephanie Anders as Missy Katonixx
Ruby Larocca as Billie
Scarlett Storm as Georgia

Reception
Daily Dead gave Call Girl of Cthulhu a score of 3.5 (out of 5), stating that while the film was "not for everyone", it would appeal to "those of you Lovecraft (and horror) fans out there looking for something just a little bit outside the norm". Fangoria rated the film "three out of four skulls" and praised its acting.

References

External links
 
 Kickstarter page

2014 films
2014 horror films
Cthulhu Mythos films
2010s English-language films